Caroline Johansson is an Australian actress of Swedish descent. She started her career as a dancer, is best known for her role in serial A Country Practice as Nurse Donna Manning in 98 episodes between 1985 and 1987, in which her character was killed-off in a car crash, in one of the series iconic storylines. She also had a small role in Home and Away in 1997 and earlier appeared in a guest role in sitcom Acropolis Now.

References

External links

Australian people of Swedish descent
Australian people of Scandinavian descent
Living people
Year of birth missing (living people)